Rheim Alkadhi  (Arabic: ريم القاضي) (born 1973) is a visual artist based in Berlin who works internationally. Alkadhi operates under contemporary conditions in alternating geographical contexts, circumscribed by objects, images, and texts, via digital media, interactions in public space, and intimate person-to-person contact. Her work is described as:"With multiple migratory belongings/trajectories in regions of imposed geopolitical conflict, the perception of authoritarian, imperial, colonial dominance is magnified in everyday life. Thus, the work registers a nonconforming emancipatory feminist existence under such planetary conditions, using mediums of language, artifacts of material reality, and living interactions."

Biography

She lived first in Benghazi, Libya, and then between Baghdad and New England. She was raised by an American mother and an Iraqi father and attended public school in Iraq until the family returned to the United States at the start of the Iran–Iraq War.

Selected projects  
Her research in various provinces of Iraq during April 2019 resulted in many of the elements featured in the ongoing framework and exhibition "Majnoon Field". 

In 2018, she participated in the experimental walking art school Spring Sessions across Jordan; later that year, she had a public staging at the migrant-run OBI market in Berlin, based on conversations and ongoing relationships initiated in that context. Displayed objects included: mock-up of geo-political extraction field; large block of Styrofoam for flotation; seven shoe fragments collected along migration routes; refugee housing in Europe for a family of eight; patterned blanket; eye of a needle. 

In 2017, "Hairs of the Oppressed" was featured at once resolved and ongoing; a sculpture concept accompanied by the text "Script for Eleven Hairs" at Autonomes Cultur Centrum, Weimar. Rotating authorial concept acknowledges the collaborative emancipatory politics/method of Theatre of the Oppressed, on which this piece is based. 

In 2016, "Night Taxi", a multimedia suite of documents (video accompanied by meter, route, and fare) outlined milliseconds leading up to the crossing of an arbitrary geographical border.

Between 2015 and 2016, she created live presentations included "Eye Theatre Closes Its Doors and Opens Them Again", commissioned for the Asia Pacific Triennial in Australia, and "Köln Phantasm" developed and performed while a fellow in visual art at Akademie Schloss Solitude in Stuttgart.

In 2014 she developed the project "Communications From the Field of Contact (Each Hair Is a Tongue)" during her residency at the Sharjah Art Foundation.

In 2012 she was a temporary member of a household of women in the West Bank village of Jamma'in in Palestine, where she developed her project "Collective Knotting Together of Hairs" with the local Women's Association, with Riwaq Center for Architectural Conservation in Ramallah, and with Al-Ma'mal Foundation for Contemporary Art in Jerusalem.

In 2012 she was artist in residence at Darat al Funun in Amman via the initiative of Rijin Sahakian and Sada for Contemporary Iraqi Art.

In 2011 she was in residence at Dar al Ma'mun in Tassoultante and then independent of institutional assistance in the village of Tahannaout, Al Haouz Province.

In 2010 she spent one month in Itaewon, Seoul with the artist-run space DoBaeBacsa.  In 2010 she was artist in residence at PØST in Los Angeles.

In 2009 she had a residency at Townhouse Gallery in Cairo, where she gathered material for the limited edition artist book "Destroyed in Baghdad / Repaired in Cairo: A Viewer's Manual to a Temporary Art Practice in the Auto Mechanics District". In 2009 she printed the limited edition artist book "Post Cards From the Clandestine Troupe".

Her work was shown at the 12th Sharjah Biennial, at the New Museum, in the 2012 Jerusalem Show, at Documenta (13), and in the 2010 Cairo Biennial.

In 2010 she received a grant from Art Matters and the Center for Cultural Innovation. In 2009 she was awarded a Mid-Career Artist Fellowship from the California Community Foundation. In 2008 she received a grant from the Arab Fund for Art and Culture. In 1990 she received an award from the National Foundation for Advancement in the Arts and from 1990 to 1994 the Musicfest award for young artists.

Selected exhibitions 

 Rheim Alkadhi: Majnoon Field - Temporary Gallery, Centre for Contemporary Art, Cologne – August 30 through December 15, 2019 (solo exhibition)
 Material Communities (Objects We Arrange in the Energy Field) -  OBI Parkplatz, Berlin – October 7, 2018 (public staging)
IM_MOBILITIES - Galerie KUB, Leipzig – June 10 through June 30, 2017 (group exhibition)
True Lies - Autonomes Cultur Centrum (ACC), Weimar – February 10 through May 7, 2017
 Why Not Ask Again?  – Power Station of Art – November 11, 2016 through March 12, 2017 (11th Shanghai Bienniale curated by Raqs Media Collective)
Sites of Return – Beit Michael Sufan, Ramallah  / Qalandiya International – October 10 through 31, 2016 (group exhibition)
8th Asia Pacific Triennial of Contemporary Art – Brisbane – November 21, 2015 through April 10, 2016 (group exhibition)
Im Dickicht der Haare / Entangled in Hair – Grimmwelt Museum, Kassel – October 9, 2015 through une 5, 2016 (group exhibition)
12th Sharjah Biennial: The Past, the Present, the Possible - Sharjah Art Foundation – March 5 through June 5, 2015
Here and Elsewhere – New Museum of Contemporary Art, New York City – July 16 through September 28, 2014 (group exhibition)
Alwan338 / Foundations – Al Riwaq Art Space, Adliya, Bahrain – March 3 through April 19, 2014
Here Is My Life Which I Devote to Learning About You – Darat al Funun, Amman – May 4 through 31, 2013 (solo exhibition)
Gestures in Time/The Jerusalem Show - West Bank and Jerusalem – November 1 through 15, 2012
Documenta (13) And and and Platform, 2012
Hesaplașma | Aftermath – Akbank Sanat, Istanbul – March 14 through May 17, 2012 (group exhibition)
Lucky Today - Glasgow International Festival of Visual Art (with Hiwa K Hiwa)   
Communitas. Among Others - Camera Austria, Graz – September 25, 2011 through January 1, 2012 (group exhibition)
12th Cairo Biennial – Opera House, Cairo – December 12, 2010  through February 12, 2011
The Page: An Interactive Exhibition of Artist Books - Guggenheim Gallery, Chapman University
What's Become of Us? - PØST, Los Angeles – November 2010
Exhibition for Adults and Children - Dobaebacsa, Seoul – April 1 through 26, 2010 (solo exhibition)
Veronica – Nichols Gallery, Pitzer Art Galleries – September 24 through December 11, 2009 (group exhibition)
OÙ? Scènes du Sud - Carré d'Art, Nîmes – June 13 through September 21, 2008 (group exhibition)  
System Error: War Is a Force That Gives Us Meaning - Palazzo delle Papesse, Sienna – February 3  through May 6, 2007
Eternal Flame: Imagining a Future at the End of the World - Redcat, Los Angeles – February 15 through April 8, 2007
When Artists Say We  – Artists Space, New York – March 8 – April 29, 2006 
Draw a Line and Follow It -  Los Angeles Contemporary Exhibitions – June 21 through August 20, 2006

Live presentations 

 Our Current Dwelling Is Fire – produced at the Rockefeller Bellagio Center; performed at March Meeting, Sharjah (2018); and Videonale Scope7, Cologne (2019)
 View Through the Eye of a Needle - performed in Wadi Rum as part of Spring Sessions (2018)
Mosul Vapor – performed at Kunstgebäude Stuttgart (2017)
 Köln Phantasm – produced and performed at Akademie Schloss Solitude (2016); performed at Kunstgebäude Stuttgart (2017)
Eye Theater Closes Its Doors and Opens Them Again – presented at Queensland Art Gallery of Modern Art, Brisbane (2015)

Online projects 

Public Directory - Makhzin 2: Feminisms, 2015
Photo Manual Baghdad – This Long Century, 2014
 Picture City Body – produced in Beirut, commissioned by the New Museum's online platform, 2013
Pictures from a Camera - photo-based poetry from the revolutionary fervor in North Africa, produced in 2011; introduction written for online journal Jadaliyya, translated to Arabic by Sinan Antoon and Bilal Khbeiz, 2011, 2012
Archive of a digital practice comprising digital and narrative gendered constructions, mostly from found online material, 2007–2010
 My Lover in Unequal Parts – 'micro literature' based on found images from concurrent wars in Iraq, Lebanon, and Palestine, 2006

Video work 

 Majnoon Field – produced from time-based material gathered in Southern Iraq, shown in the exhibition by the same name – 00:10:00, 2019
 Night Taxi - commissioned by Raqs Media Collective for Shanghai Bienniale – 00:03:00, 2016
ruh  - produced using ephemeral materials available within a makeshift residency in Itaewan, Seoul – 00:06:35, 2010
 Subtitles for Stolen Pictures - produced from visual elements of online reportage, US occupation of Iraq – 00:08:00, 2007

Artist books 

 Majnoon Field Samples -  color-based poetry, produced for view within the exhibition "Majnoon Field", 2019
 Post Cards from the Clandestine Troupe – book of postcards generated from queered online war imagery from Iraq, with original texts, limited edition of 30, 2009

References 

1973 births
American people of Iraqi descent
Iraqi contemporary artists
Iraqi women artists
Living people
University of California, Irvine alumni